Meragisa is a genus of moths of the family Notodontidae. The genus contains about 45 species, distributed from Mexico south to Bolivia and Brazil.

Selected species
Meragisa dasra Dognin, 1904
Meragisa nicolasi Schaus, 1939
Meragisa valdiviesoi (Dognin, 1890)
Meragisa zebrina Miller, 2011

References

Notodontidae